Moenkhausia is a genus of freshwater fish in the family Characidae native to tropical and subtropical South America.

The diamond tetra and red-eye tetra, which are commonly kept in aquaria, are members of this genus.

Species
There are currently 90 recognized species in this genus:

References

Characidae
Fish of South America
Freshwater fish genera
Taxa named by Carl H. Eigenmann